St. Peter's Church, Seaview is a parish church in the Church of England located in Seaview, Isle of Wight.

History

The church was built in 1859 by the architect Thomas Hellyer. It was built as a chapel of ease, and has a nave of four bays, north aisle, and south porch. The ecclesiastical parish was formed in 1907.

The south aisle and Lady Chapel were added as war memorials.

Organ

The church Originally had a small pipe organ by Bevington, which was added to at the end of the 1800s by Lewis. A specification of the organ can be found on the National Pipe Organ Register.

References

Church of England church buildings on the Isle of Wight